Dayananda Sagar University is a private university. It is located in Bangalore, Karnataka, India.
Dayananda Sagar University a.k.a DSU has four different campuses in Karnataka:
The first one is the largest
Campus 1: Dayananda Sagar University
Devarakaggalahalli, Harohalli,
Kanakapura Road, Ramanagara Dt.,
Bengaluru – 562 112

References

External links 

Private universities in India
Universities in Bangalore
2014 establishments in Karnataka
Educational institutions established in 2014